The Glover River is a  tributary of the Little River in the Ouachita Mountains of southeastern Oklahoma in the United States.  Via the Little and Red rivers, it is part of the watershed of the Mississippi River.

The Glover River flows for its entire length in McCurtain County.

Conservation and recreation

The Glover River is remote and little known, but has Class I and II rapids, good scenery, and canoeing and kayaking except in summer when water levels are often too low for floating. Its course is through a heavily forested area bordered by steep bluffs on each side of the river.

The Glover flows through the Three Rivers Wildlife Management Area,  owned by the Weyerhaeuser Company and mostly planted in Loblolly Pine plantations.  A permit is required to access Weyerhaeuser lands.

See also
List of Oklahoma rivers

References

DeLorme (2003).  Oklahoma Atlas & Gazetteer.  Yarmouth, Maine: DeLorme.  .

Rivers of Oklahoma
Bodies of water of McCurtain County, Oklahoma
Tributaries of the Red River of the South